Stefania riae (common name: Sarisarinama carrying frog) is a species of frog in the family Hemiphractidae. This species is only known from Cerro Sarisariñama, a tepui in the Bolívar State, Venezuela.

Etymology
The specific name riae honors Ria Hoogmoed-Verschoor, spouse of the second author.

Description
Adult males measure  and females  in snout–vent length. The tympanum is visible and relatively large. The canthus rostralis is distinct. All fingers and toes have well-developed discs. The toes have basal webbing. There are four color forms without consistent relationship with a specimen's sex. Possible patterns are 1) mostly pale brown, possibly with a few indistinct darker spots, 2) pattern that is other wise variable but always with paler dorsal background than dorsolateral stripes, 3) chevrons or spots on the dorsum, and 4) brown dorsum without dorsolateral stripes and chevrons, but with several dark brown spots and golden spots scattered around the head, body, and limbs. The two first forms are the most common ones.

Habitat and conservation
In 2002, Stefania riae was abundant in humid environments inside the Sima Humboldt (=Sima Mayor) sinkhole (but none were found from near its edge); many specimens were found on mossy walls soaked by water, bushes and plants, and on sandstone walls.

There are no known threats to this species. Cerro Sarisariñama is within the Jaua-Sarisariñama National Park.

References

riae
Amphibians of Venezuela
Endemic fauna of Venezuela
Amphibians described in 1984
Taxa named by William Edward Duellman
Taxonomy articles created by Polbot
Taxa named by Marinus Steven Hoogmoed
Amphibians of the Tepuis